The 1941 Romanian census was conducted on 6 April 1941 in all territories still remaining in the Kingdom of Romania, following the loss of land to Hungary (Northern Transylvania), Bulgaria (Southern Dobruja), and the Soviet Union (Bessarabia, Hertsa, and Northern Bukovina). After the Axis invasion of the Soviet Union, Romania retook control of its lands that the Soviet Union had invaded, in which it conducted the census separately in the autumn of 1941. Later, Romania also annexed the Transnistria Governorate, finishing the census by conducting it there in December 1941.

After a six-day trip across multi-ethnic Romanian regions, he reported to Sabin Manuilă and Ion Antonescu (then the leader of Romania), praising the methods of the census and predicting that it would offer an accurate count. Hungarian statistician  has stated that the data, specifically with reference to ethnic Hungarians in Southern Transylvania, is quite correct. Despite this, several other Hungarian ethnographers and demographers continue to dispute the numbers found by the census. The provisional results of the census were first publicly released in 1944 by the National Institute of Statistics.

Notably, it was the first Romanian census to include ethnic origin as a separate category. The census, on Manuilă's direction, also included a special section cataloguing all Jewish-owned property, a summary of which was sent to the German Main Security Office.

Results 

The ethnic structure of Romania, in its April 1941 borders, was as follows:

The ethnic structure of Romania, in its December 1941 borders, was as follows:

The ethnic structure of the Transnistria Governorate, which was the last territory Romania annexed in which this census was undertaken in December 1941, was as follows:

See also 
 Demographic history of Romania

References 

Censuses in Romania
1941 in Romania
1941 censuses